Harlan Philip Hanson (February 18, 1925 – November 28, 1996), also known as "Harpo" Hanson, was an American educator and the Director of the Advanced Placement Program from 1965 to 1989.

Harvard and WWII
Born in Madison, Wisconsin in 1925, Hanson attended Harvard University in the early 1940s but his education at Harvard was interrupted in 1943 when he was drafted into service with the U.S. Army Air Forces. After World War II, he returned to Harvard, where he graduated summa cum laude in 1948. That year he received the John A. Walz, Jr. Prize for "Best Divisional Examination" in German. In 1950, Hanson assumed the position of an assistant dean at Harvard.  During this period, Hanson was senior tutor at Kirkland House, where he resided with his wife and Radcliffe graduate, Dorothea Reynolds. Hanson received his Ph.D from Harvard in 1959. Prior to his graduation, he lived in Alsace and studied in Europe on a scholarship.

Career

In 1954, Harvard began to offer students credit and advanced standing for work completed in high school, including Advanced Placement (AP) courses, and Hanson, then a graduate student was given the task of implementing the new program. With two colleagues, Hanson, started the Office of Advanced Standing at Harvard University, and as Director of Harvard's Office of Advanced Standing in 1955, Hanson worked to get all academic departments to standardize their award-granting requirements and to align their policies with the standards outlined by the College Entrance Examination Board (CEEB). Hanson was a member of the Committee of Examiners for the 1956–1957 AP German syllabus.

Hanson quit his position with Harvard's office of Advanced Standing in November 1957 to accept an assistant professorship at Williams College. By the time Hanson left Harvard, Advanced Standing existed in 174 colleges, and Harvard alone grew from 39 students admitted with advanced standing the first year, to 174 the year Hanson left. He remained through the mid  1960s at Williams College. During this period he translated History of the Weimar Republic and also translated and edited a German anthology. Hanson also served as Chief Reader for the AP German examinations while at Williams College.

In 1965, Hanson succeeded Jack Arbolino as Director of the Advanced Placement program for the College Board and he remained at this position until 1989.  For 23 of these years, Hanson "administered the program single-handedly, with some secretarial help and advice from the Educational Testing Service," yet under his leadership the AP program nonetheless "grew exponentially." By the time he left the post of Director, the number of high schools offering AP courses had increased from 93 to over 8000, and the number of colleges that accepted AP courses had grown from fewer than 50 to nearly 2000. During this same period, the number of high school students participating in AP courses increased from 34,000 to about 315,000.

In the mid-1960s, Hanson was one of the original council members of the International Schools Examinations Syndicate, which later became the International Baccalaureate Organisation. He was instrumental in acquiring funding from the Ford Foundation for IB and securing university recognition from Ivy League schools such as Harvard and Princeton for the IB Diploma Programme. Hanson was also a founding member of the board of International Baccalaureate North America (IBNA).

Footnotes

References

20th-century American educators
Harvard University alumni
People from Madison, Wisconsin
1925 births
1996 deaths
United States Army Air Forces soldiers
United States Army personnel of World War II